Alçay-Alçabéhéty-Sunharette is a commune in the Pyrénées-Atlantiques department in the Nouvelle-Aquitaine region in southwestern France.

Geography

Location
Alçay-Alçabéhéty-Sunharette is located in the former province of Soule. It is located some 35 km west by south-west of Oloron-Sainte-Marie and 10 km north of Larrau.

Access
The commune can be accessed by the small D247 road from the village to Tardets-Sorholus in the north-east. The D149 branches off this road in the commune and goes north to Camou-Cihigue. There is also the D117 road which goes west from the village to Mendive.

Hydrography
Located in the drainage basin of the Adour, most of the southern border of the commune is formed by the Alphoura river (18 km long) which also flows through the village  and continues northeast to join the Saison near Alos-Sibas-Abense. The Alphoura is fed by many tributaries rising in the commune including the Azaléguy and Ardounc. The Escalérako erreka rises in the south and flows west with its many tributaries.

Paul Raymond mentioned the Arangaïxa, a brook that rises at Alçay and flows into the Alphoura.

Localities and hamlets

 Aguer (Barn)
 Albinzé (cayolar)
 Alçabéhéty
 Alçay
 Ampo
 Andoche (cayolar)
 Arangaitz (Pass)
 Arhansus (cayolar)
 Arhex Borde
 Atheis
 Azaléguy
 Azaléguiko Karbia (Cave)
 Bagadoya
 Bagazaguita (cayolar)
 Bagothusta
 Belhy
 Berrayde
 Bethalia
 Bidalunia
 Bordagagna
 Borda Iribarneko
 Bordapia
 Burdin Olatzé (cayolar)
 Burgance
 Çaro
 Chaldupia
 Chuburu
 Croix Garat (la)
 Elichabeborda
 Eltzegagnia (cayolar)
 Erbinia
 Espoulapia
 Esquirassy (district)
 Etcheberri Borda
 Etcheverry
 Etchecopar Borda
 Eyhéraber
 Ezpalako Larria
 Goyheneix Borde
 Gutux Borde
 Habrague (cayolar)
 Handia (Borda)
 Haquits (Mill)
 Harizmendy
 Harristolatzia
 Houretaborda
 Ibarburia (Pass)
 Ibarria
 Illaberria
 Inharchoury
 Irriko Borda
 Kamitchel
 Kharalda
 Lapistoy
 Larramendia
 Laxunia
 Laze
 Lechardoy
 Lecharria (cayolar)
 Lekayborda
 Leziague (fountain)
 Lomendi
 Luchiloa
 Lucu
 Lutogagne
 Maraizolatzé
 Méthola
 Miranda
 Néquézaurborda
 Ourdanberhartia
 Oxapuria
 Oxibar (Pass)
 Pista Uthurria
 Poyuko Borda
 Sallaberriko borda
 Sobieta (Grange)
 Sunharette
 Thipinka
 Ursoy (cayolar)
 Utzidoy
 Uztarila (cayolar)
 Uztubulia

Toponymy

The commune name in Basque is Altzai-Altzabeheti-Zunharreta.

According to Jean-Baptiste Orpustan, the base (h)altz meaning "aulne" was used for both the toponyms Alcay and Alçabéhéty. beheti means "at the bottom".

The name Sunharette comes from the Basque zunhar (Name from Soule meaning "elm" or "poplar") using the romanized locative suffix ette meaning the "place of elm".

The following table details the origins of the commune name and other names in the commune.

Sources:
Orpustan: Jean-Baptiste Orpustan,   New Basque Toponymy
Raymond: Topographic Dictionary of the Department of Basses-Pyrenees, 1863, on the page numbers indicated in the table. 
Cassini1: Alçabéhéty on the Ldh/EHESS/Cassini database
Cassini2: Sunharette on the Ldh/EHESS/Cassini database

Origins:
Duchesne: Duchesne collection volume CXIV
Ohix: Contracts retained by Ohix, Notary of Soule
Chronicles: Chronicles of Arthez-Lassalle
Soule: Custom of Soule

History
In 1790 Sunharette was the chief town of a canton which was part of the District of Mauleon. The canton included the communes of Alçay-Alçabéhéty-Sunharette, Alos-Sibas-Abense, Camou-Cihigue, Etchebar, Lacarry-Arhan-Charritte-de-Haut, Lichans-Sunhar, and Ossas-Suhare.

In 1833, the three communes of Alçay, Alçabéhéty, and Sunharette merged to form a single joint commune.

Heraldry

Administration

List of Successive Mayors

Inter-communality
The town is part of seven intercommunal organisations:
the Communauté d'agglomération du Pays Basque
the association to support Basque culture;
the SIVOM of the canton of Tardets;
the intercommunal association of the gaves d'Oloron and Mauléon
the SIVU for Tourism in Haute-Soule and Barétous;
the AEP association for Soule Country
the association for remediation of Soule Country

Population

Economy
Activity is mainly focused on agriculture (livestock and pasture). The town is part of the Appellation d'origine contrôlée (AOC) zone of Ossau-Iraty cheese.

Culture and heritage

Civil heritage
The commune has two sites that are registered as historical monuments:
The Seven Ibarnaba Tumuli in the Esquirassy district
The Ten Ibarletta Tumuli in the Esquirassy district

Other sites of interest
The Gaztelu zahar (Basque meaning "fortified place") of Maide korralea meaning "the enclosure of Maide" is attributed to Maidé, mythological beings incorporating some of the traits of Jentils and Laminak.

Religious Heritage
The Romanesque Parish Church of Saint-Pierre (Middle Ages) is registered as an historical monument. The church contains a Processional Cross (16th century) which is registered as an historical object.

Environmental heritage
The Belhygagne peaks (also called the peak of Vultures) and Gaztelia are the highest points in the commune at, respectively, 1,072 and 1,345 metres high.

See also
Communes of the Pyrénées-Atlantiques department

References

External links
Alçay-Alçabéhéty-Sunharette on Géoportail, National Geographic Institute (IGN) website 
Sunharete and Alcabehety on the 1750 Cassini Map

Communes of Pyrénées-Atlantiques